The Pallas's cat (Otocolobus manul), also known as the manul, is a small wild cat with long and dense light grey fur, and rounded ears set low on the sides of the head. It is well camouflaged and adapted to the cold continental climate in its native range, which receives little rainfall and experiences a wide range of temperatures.

The Pallas's cat was first described in 1776 by Peter Simon Pallas, who observed it in the vicinity of Lake Baikal. Since then, it has been recorded across a large region in Central Asia, albeit in widely spaced sites from the Caucasus, Iranian Plateau, Hindu Kush, parts of the Himalayas, Tibetan Plateau to the Altai-Sayan region and South Siberian Mountains. It inhabits rocky montane grasslands and shrublands, where the snow cover is below . It finds shelter in rock crevices and burrows, and preys foremost on lagomorphs and rodents. The female gives birth to between two and six kittens in spring.

Due to its widespread range and assumed large population, the Pallas's cat has been listed as Least Concern on the IUCN Red List since 2020. Some population units are threatened by poaching, prey base decline due to rodent control programs, and habitat fragmentation as a result of mining and infrastructure projects.

The Pallas's cat has been kept in zoos since the early 1950s.  60 zoos in Europe, Russia, North America and Japan participate in Pallas's cat captive breeding programs.

Taxonomy
Felis manul was the scientific name used by Peter Simon Pallas in 1776, who first described a Pallas's cat that he had encountered near the Dzhida River southeast of Lake Baikal.
Several Pallas's cat zoological specimens were subsequently described:
Felis nigripectus proposed by Brian Houghton Hodgson in 1842 was based on three specimens from Tibet.
Otocolobus manul ferrugineus proposed by Sergey Ognev in 1928 was an erythristic specimen from the Kopet Dag mountains.

Otocolobus was proposed by Johann Friedrich von Brandt in 1842 as a generic name. Reginald Innes Pocock recognized the taxonomic rank of Otocolobus in 1907, described several Pallas's cat skulls in detail and considered the Pallas's cat an aberrant form of Felis.

In 1951, John Ellerman and Terence Morrison-Scott considered
the nominate subspecies Felis manul manul to be distributed from Russian Turkestan to Transbaikalia;
F. m. nigripecta to be distributed in Tibet and Kashmir;
F. m. ferruginea occurring from southwestern Turkestan and the Kopet Dag mountains to Afghanistan and Balochistan.

Since 2017, the Cat Classification Task Force of the Cat Specialist Group recognises only two subspecies as valid taxa, namely:
O. m. manul syn. O. m. ferrugineus in the western and northern part of Central Asia from Iran to Mongolia;
O. m. nigripectus in the Himalayas from Kashmir to Bhutan.

Phylogeny
The Pallas's cat is estimated to have genetically diverged from a common ancestor with the genus Prionailurus between  based on analysis of nuclear DNA. Based on analysis of mitochondrial DNA, it diverged  from a common ancestor with Felis.

Characteristics

The Pallas's cat's fur is light grey with pale yellowish-ochre or pale yellowish-reddish hues. Some hair tips are white and some blackish. Its fur is greyer and denser with fewer markings visible in winter than in the summer. The forehead and top of the head are light grey with small black spots. It has two black zigzag lines on the cheeks running from the corner of the eyes to the jaw joints. Its chin, whiskers, lower and upper lips are white.
It has narrow black stripes on the back, consisting of five to seven dark transversal lines across the lower back. Its grey tail has seven narrow black rings and a black tip.

The Pallas's cat's ears are grey with a yellowish tinge on the back and a darker rim, but with whitish hair in front and in the ear pinnae. Its rounded ears are set low on the side, such that it can peer over an object and show only a relatively small part of the head above the eyes without depressing the ears. This can give its face a look of ferocity and unrest. Its eyes are encircled by white. The iris is yellowish, and its pupils contract to small circular disks in sunlight. Among the Felinae, it shares this trait of round pupils with Puma, Herpailurus and Acinonyx species.

The Pallas's cat is about the size of a domestic cat (Felis catus). Its stocky posture with the long and dense fur make it appear stout and plush. It weighs .
Its body is stout, and its skull is rounded with a short nasal bone, an enlarged cranial part and rounded zygomatic arches. Its orbits are large and directed forward. Its legs are short with short and sharp retractile claws. 

The lower carnassial teeth are powerful, and the upper carnassials are short and massive. The first pair of upper premolars is absent. It has a bite force at the canine tip of 155.4 newtons and a bite force quotient at the canine tip of 113.8.

The mitochondrial genome of the Pallas's cat consists of 16,672 base pairs containing 13 protein-coding, 22 transfer RNA and two ribosomal RNA genes and one non-coding RNA control region.

Distribution and habitat
The Pallas's cat's range extends from the Caucasus eastward to Central Asia, Mongolia and adjacent parts of Dzungaria and the Tibetan Plateau. It inhabits montane shrublands and grasslands, rocky outcrops, scree slopes and ravines in areas, where the continuous snow cover is below .
In the southwestern part of its range, the habitat of the Pallas's cat is affected by cold and dry winters, and moderate to low rainfall in warm summers. The typical vegetation in this part consists of small shrubs, sagebrush (Artemisia), Festuca and Stipa grasses.
In the central part of its range, it inhabits hilly landscapes, high plateaus and intermontane valleys that are covered by dry steppe or semi-desert vegetation, such as low shrubs and xerophytic grasses.

The Greater Caucasus region is considered climatically suitable for the Pallas's cat. In Armenia, an individual was killed near Vedi in the mountains of Ararat Province in the late 1920s. Records in Azerbaijan are limited to a Pallas's cat skin found in Karabakh and a sighting of an individual in Julfa District, both in the late 20th century.

On the Iranian Plateau, two Pallas's cats were encountered near the Aras River in northwestern Iran before the 1970s. In the area, an individual was captured at an elevation of about  near Azarshahr in East Azerbaijan Province in 2008. In the same year, a camera trap recorded a Pallas's cat on the southern slopes of the central Alborz Mountains in Khojir National Park shortly after heavy snowfall. In the Aladagh and Kopet Dag Mountains, the Pallas's cat was recorded inside and in the vicinity of protected areas. In the south of the Zagros Mountains, an individual was caught in a corral used by transhumant pastoralists in Abadeh County in 2012. The surrounding area consists of rocky steppe habitat dominated by mountain almond (Prunus scoparia), Astragalus and Artemisia.
In the Hindu Kush, a Pallas's cat was observed sunbathing at the fringe of a rocky high-elevation plain near Dasht-e Nawar in Afghanistan's Koh-i-Baba range in April 2007. The Pallas's cat was also photographed multiple times in Bamyan Province between 2015 and 2017.

In the Transcaspian Region, its presence was first reported in the Kopet Dag mountains and in the vicinity of the Tedzhen and Murghab Rivers in the late 19th century. In Turkmenistan's Sünt-Hasardag Nature Reserve, a camera trap recorded an individual in 2019. The Pallas's cat is allegedly also present in Köpetdag Nature Reserve.

Historical records of the Pallas's cat are known in the Surxondaryo Region and Gissar Range along the border of Tajikistan and Uzbekistan. In Kyrgyzstan, it is present at high elevations of Sarychat-Ertash State Nature Reserve and in the foothills of the Alay Range. In 2013, a dead female was found in a valley near Engilchek, Kyrgyzstan. In Kazakhstan, it inhabits the highlands and steppes of central and east Kazakhstan Region, the periphery of the Betpak-Dala Desert, the northern Balkhash District and the Tarbagatai Mountains.

In the South Siberian Mountains, it inhabits grasslands on the Ukok Plateau and in the Altai, Kuray and Saylyugem Mountains. It is also present in Chagan-Uzun and Argut river basins, Mongun-Taiga, Uvs Lake Basin, Sayano-Shushenski Nature Reserve, Tunkinsky National Park, Lake Gusinoye basin and in the interfluves of the Selenga, Chikoy and Khilok rivers. In the eastern Sayan Mountains, its presence was documented for the first time in 1997. In 2013, an individual was observed on the Vitim Plateau.

The Pallas's cat inhabits the semi-desert steppe of Ikh Nartiin Chuluu Nature Reserve in Mongolia. In Khustain Nuruu National Park and Gobi Gurvansaikhan National Park, it prefers rocky and rugged habitats that provides cover and camouflage.
One of them swam across an irrigation channel. In 2011, the Pallas's cat was photographed in an alpine meadow in the core area of Sanjiangyuan National Nature Reserve. In Ruoergai, it was observed at several places in habitat that was frequented by pastoralists and their livestock herds.

The presence of the Pallas's cat in the Himalayas was first reported in Ladakh's Indus valley in 1991.
In December 2012, the Pallas's cat was recorded for the first time in the Nepal Himalayas.
In January 2012, it was recorded for the first time in Bhutan, namely in rolling hills dominated by glacial outwash and alpine steppe vegetation in Wangchuck Centennial National Park. In 2019, scat samples of two individuals were found in Sagarmatha National Park, providing the first genetic evidence of the cat's presence in the eastern Himalayas.

Behaviour and ecology

The Pallas's cat is solitary. Of nine Pallas's cat kittens observed in captivity, only the two males scent marked by spraying urine.

The Pallas's cat uses caves, rock crevices and marmot burrows as shelter. In central Mongolia, 29 Pallas's cat were fitted with radio collars between June 2005 and October 2007. They used 101 dens during this time, including 39 winter dens, 42 summer dens and 20 dens for raising kittens. They resided in the summer dens for 2–21 days, and in the winter dens for 2–28 days. Summer and maternal dens were close to rocky habitats with little direct sunlight, whereas winter dens were closer to ravines. The sizes of their home ranges decreased in winter.

In an unprotected area in central Mongolia, Pallas's cats were mainly crepuscular between May and August, but active by day from September to November. Pallas's cats recorded in four study areas in the western Mongolian Altai mountains were also active during the day, but with a lower frequency at sites where livestock was present.

Hunting and diet
The Pallas's cat is a highly specialised predator of small mammals, which it catches by stalking or ambushing near exits of burrows. It also pulls out rodents with its paws from shallow burrows. In the Altai Mountains, remains of long-tailed ground squirrel (Urocitellus undulatus), flat-skulled shrew (Sorex roboratus), Pallas's pika (Ochotona pallasi) and bird feathers were found near breeding burrows of Pallas's cats. In Transbaikal, it preys on Daurian pika (Ochotona dauurica), steppe pika (O. pusilla), Daurian ground squirrel (Spermophilus dauricus) and young of red-billed chough (Pyrrhocorax pyrrhocorax).
Scat samples of the Pallas's cat collected in the bufferzone of Khustain Nuruu National Park in central Mongolia contained foremost remains of Daurian pika, Mongolian gerbil (Meriones unguiculatus), Mongolian silver vole (Alticola semicanus) and remains of passerine birds, beetles and grasshoppers. Brandt's vole (Lasiopodomys brandtii) dominated in the diet of Pallas's cats in Mongolia's Sükhbaatar Province after the irruptive growth of this vole population during 2017 to 2020.
Scat found in Shey-Phoksundo National Park contained remains of pika species and of woolly hare (Lepus oiostolus). Remains of a cypriniform fish were found in Pallas's cat scat in Gongga Mountain Nature Reserve.

Reproduction and life cycle

The female is sexually mature at the age of about one year. She is in estrus for 26 to 42 hours. Gestation lasts 66 to 75 days.

A captive male Pallas's cat housed under natural lighting conditions showed increased aggressive and territorial behaviour at the onset of the breeding season, lasting from September to December. Its blood contained three times more testosterone than in the non-breeding season, and its ejaculate was more concentrated with more normal sperm forms and a higher motility of sperm.

In the wild, the female gives birth to a litter of two to six kittens between the end of April and late May. The newborn kittens' fur is fuzzy, and their eyes are closed until the age of about two weeks.

In central Mongolia, seven females with kittens were observed using 20 dens for 4–60 days. Their maternal dens were either among rocks, or in former burrows of the Tarbagan marmot (Marmota sibirica), and had at least two entrances. In Iran, a Pallas's cat was observed using cavities of aged Greek juniper (Juniperus excelsa) as breeding dens for a litter of four kittens.

Two-month-old kittens weigh , and their fur gradually grows longer. They start hunting at the age of about five months and reach adult size by the age of six to seven months.

Threats
In China, Mongolia and Russia, the Pallas's cat was once hunted for its fur in large numbers of more than 10,000 skins annually. In China and the former Soviet Union, hunting of the Pallas's cat decreased in the 1970s when it became legally protected. Mongolia exported 9,185 skins in 1987, but international trade has ceased since 1988. However, domestic trade of its skins and body parts for medicinal purposes continues in the country, and it may be hunted throughout the year.

Cases of herding dogs killing Pallas's cats were reported in Iran, Kazakhstan and the Altai Republic.
Pallas's cats have also fallen victim in traps set for small mammals in Kazakhstan and in the Altai Republic. In Transbaikal, the Pallas's cat is threatened by poaching. In Mongolia, the use of the rodenticide bromadiolone in the frame of rodent control measures in the early 21st century poisoned the prey base of carnivores and raptors.
The Pallas's cat may be negatively affected by habitat fragmentation due to mining and infrastructure projects.

Conservation

On the IUCN Red List, the Pallas's cat is classified as Least Concern since 2020 because of its wide-spread range and assumed large global population. It is listed in CITES Appendix II. Hunting it is prohibited in all range countries except Mongolia. Since 2009, it is legally protected in Afghanistan, where all hunting and trade with its body parts is banned.
On the Mongolian Red List of Mammals, it is listed as Near Threatened since 2006. In China, it is listed as Endangered. In Turkmenistan, it is proposed to be listed as Critically Endangered due to the scarcity of contemporary records.

In captivity
Between 1951 and 1979, the Beijing Zoo kept 16 Pallas's cats, but they lived for less than three years. In 1984, the Pallas's cat was designated as a priority species for captive breeding of the American Association of Zoos and Aquariums's Species Survival Plan. Almost half of the kittens born in member zoos died within the first 30 days, reaching the highest mortality rate in captivity of any small wild cat.

Zoos in the former Soviet Union received most of the wild-caught Pallas's cats from the Transbaikal region and a few from Mongolia. Moscow Zoo initiated a studbook for the Pallas's cat in 1997. Since 2004, the Pallas's cat international studbook has been managed by the Royal Zoological Society of Scotland, which also coordinates the captive breeding program for the Pallas's cat within the European Endangered Species Programme. As of 2018, 177 Pallas's cats were kept in 60 zoos in Europe, Russia, North America and Japan.

In 2011, a female Pallas's cat was artificially inseminated for the first time with semen from the male at the Cincinnati Zoo. After 69 days, she gave birth to four kittens, of which one was stillborn.

Etymology
'Manul' is the Pallas's cat's name in the Kyrgyz language. It is called 'manol' in the Mongolian language. The common name 'Pallas's cat' was coined by William Thomas Blanford in honour of Peter Simon Pallas.

In popular culture 
The Pallas's cat is featured in a Russian Internet meme known as "Pet the cat" introduced in 2008. It is typically an image macro with a picture of an unfriendly and stern-looking Pallas's cat accompanied by a caption in which the cat invites the reader to pet it. In 2012, the Pallas's cat overwhelmingly won an online vote to become the Moscow Zoo mascot.

References

External links

Pallas's cat
Pallas's cat
IUCN Red List least concern species
Pallas's cat
Taxa named by Peter Simon Pallas